Tabley is a name that is a component of several place names around where the M6 motorway and A556 cross (M6 junction 19) in Cheshire, England. It comes from Anglo-Saxon Tabban-lēah = "Tabba's clearing or meadow", and may refer to:

Tabley House, an 18th-century Palladian mansion at Tabley Inferior.
Baron de Tabley
St Peter's Church, Tabley, a chapel to the west of Tabley House.
Cuckooland Museum, a museum in Tabley, which hosts the world's largest and finest collection of antique cuckoo clocks.
Tabley Inferior, a civil parish in the Borough of Cheshire East and ceremonial county of Cheshire in England
Tabley Superior (or Over Tabley), a civil parish in the Borough of Cheshire East and ceremonial county of Cheshire in England